Derry Greyhound Stadium also known as the Brandywell Greyhound Track is the greyhound racing operation held at the Brandywell Showgrounds next to the new Brandywell Stadium in Northern Ireland. The track was relocated from around the football pitch to next door to it, opening in 2018. Racing takes place every Monday evening.

History
Northern Irish greyhound tracks are unusual in the sport of greyhound racing within the United Kingdom due to the fact that they do not fall within the jurisdiction of the Greyhound Board of Great Britain. Instead, the Bord na gCon (the Irish Greyhound Board) oversee proceedings.

The track in Derry raced for the first time on 29 July 1932 under the leadership of Hugh Duffy. The track was constructed around the Brandywell Stadium football stadium, home of Derry City.

The original track was regarded as being one of the smallest in Ireland. The Brandywell Greyhound Racing Company were responsible for ensuring that racing continued over the years, even during the period from 1971 until 1985 when the football was cancelled here due to the unrest in Northern Ireland. The greyhound racing was fortunate to experience just one short closure which took place in 1971 following the loss of 20 fixtures previously. There was a dispute between Derry FC and the greyhound management in 1968 when the weekly rent was increased from £12-6 to £20 per week.

The track hosts an Irish Greyhound Derby trial stake every year and major events have included the James Corry Marathon, Festival Derby and Ulster 500.

New track
The greyhound race track closed on Saturday 3 December 2016. The stadium was demolished, with plans announced for a new stadium and a stand-alone greyhound track.  The new stand-alone greyhound track was part of the 2018 £7m development for a new state-of-the-art stadium. The facility, funded by Derry City and Strabane District Council in conjunction with the Executive Office, included the track, which was opened for trials by the Brandywell Greyhound Racing Company on 9 February 2018. Racing continues every Monday evening.

Track records
New track (current)

New track (former)

Old track

References

Greyhound racing in Ireland
Sports venues completed in 1932
Greyhound racing venues in the United Kingdom
1932 establishments in Northern Ireland